Endotricha parki is a species of snout moth in the genus Endotricha. It was described by B.W. Lee and Y.S. Bae in 2007. It is found in Korea.

References

Endotrichini
Moths described in 2007